November Group were an alternative musical group, and a participant of the Boston new wave scene in the early 1980s. The group was formed primarily around two female musicians, vocalist and guitarist Ann Prim and keyboardist Kearney Kirby. Other members included Joel Beale and Alvan Long. The band took their name from a group of early twentieth-century German expressionist artists known as November Group. The group's musical style has been described as cold wave.

History
November Group formed in Boston in the early 1980s by Ann Prim and Kearney Kirby, former members of the group Wunderkind. The group produced cold, arty synthesizer music. Their first major album release was Work that Dream, releases in 1985 on A & M Records. They also recorded an EP in Germany with Peter Hauke of early electronic music pioneers, Tangerine Dream.

Discography
The discography of November Group includes three albums, an EP, and some singles.  

 November Group on Modern Method Records -1982
 "Pictures of the Homeland" from November Group
 Persistent Memories on Brain Eater Records - 1983 
 "Put Your Back to It" from Persistent Memories Work That Dream EP on A&M Records - 1985
 NG89'' - 1989 (released on cassette tape)

References

American new wave musical groups
American post-punk music groups
Musical groups from Boston
A&M Records artists